Parker Brent Bugg (born October 26, 1994) is an American professional baseball pitcher in the Minnesota Twins organization. He is currently a phantom ballplayer, having spent two days on the Miami Marlins’ active roster without appearing in an MLB game.

Amateur career

Bugg played high school baseball at Rancho Bernardo High School and college baseball for the LSU Tigers.

Professional career

Miami Marlins
Bugg was first drafted by the Baltimore Orioles in the 34th round of the 2013 Major League Baseball Draft out of high school, but he did not sign with Baltimore. Three years later, he was drafted by the Miami Marlins in the 27th round 2016 Major League Baseball Draft and signed.

His contract was selected by the Marlins on August 14, 2022, but he was designated for assignment two days later without appearing in a game and was outrighted to Triple-A. He elected free agency on November 10, 2022.

Minnesota Twins
On February 3, 2023, Bugg signed a minor league contract with the Minnesota Twins organization.

References

External links

LSU Tigers bio

1994 births
People from Louisville, Kentucky
Rancho Bernardo High School alumni
Living people
Batavia Muckdogs players
Greensboro Grasshoppers players
Jacksonville Jumbo Shrimp players
Jupiter Hammerheads players
LSU Tigers baseball players
New Orleans Baby Cakes players
Pensacola Blue Wahoos players